Penicillium buchwaldii is a fungus species of the genus of Penicillium which produces asperphenamate, citreoisocoumarin, communesin A, communesin B, asperentin and 5'-hydroxy-asperentin

See also
List of Penicillium species

References

buchwaldii
Fungi described in 2012